Thomas Mann Prize (German: Thomas-Mann-Preis) is a literary prize of Germany. In full the title is "Thomas Mann Prize of the city of Lübeck and the Bavarian Academy of Fine Arts". It is given in alternate years in Lübeck and in Munich. The award is the product of a merger of two prizes in 2010, the Thomas Mann Preis der Hansestadt Lübeck (Thomas Mann Prize Lübeck) and the Großer Literaturpreis (Great Literature Prize) of the Bavarian Academy of Fine Arts. The Thomas Mann Prize Lübeck was first awarded in 1975; the  Great Literature Prize was first awarded in 1950. The prize money is €25,000.

Recipients

 2010: Christa Wolf
 2011: Jan Assmann
 2012: Thomas Hürlimann
 2013: Juli Zeh
 2014: Rüdiger Safranski
 2015: Lars Gustafsson
 2016: Jenny Erpenbeck
 2017: Brigitte Kronauer
 2018: Mircea Cărtărescu
 2019: Claudio Magris
 2020: Nora Bossong
 2021: Norbert Gstrein
 2022: Jonathan Franzen

References

External links

Thomas Mann Prize, official website
Thomas Mann Prize – Buddenbrookhaus

German literary awards
Awards established in 2010
Awards established in 1975